Pârâul Sec may refer to:
 Pârâul Sec, a tributary of the Brătei in Dâmbovița County
 Pârâul Sec, a tributary of the Costești in Vâlcea County
 Pârâul Sec, a tributary of the Dămuc in Neamț County
 Pârâul Sec, a tributary of the Lotru in Vâlcea County
 Pârâul Sec (Olt), a tributary of the Olt in Vâlcea County
 Pârâul Sec, a tributary of the Prahova in Brașov County
 Pârâul Sec, a tributary of the Rudăreasa in Vâlcea County